Footdee (Scots: Fittie) is an area of Aberdeen, Scotland known locally by its Scots language name of Fittie.  It is an old fishing village at the east end of Aberdeen Harbour. The name is actually folk etymology. Far from being "Foot of the Dee/Fit o the Dee", it is actually a corruption of a former dedication to a "St Fittick". It has also been referred to as Fort Dee.

The area has had a settlement as far back as the Medieval times and the first recorded reference to the area of Fittie was in the year 1398. This village was slightly further North than where Footdee is now located. It would have been near to where the St Clement's Church is located.

On an 1828 map, the new housing squares were specifically labelled 'Fish Town'. 'Footdee' referred to the larger area from St. Clement's Church to 'Fish Town'. Later, the name 'Footdee' was used to refer specifically to the housing squares, with 'Fish Town' becoming forgotten.

On Tuesday 25 September 2012, parts of Footdee became covered in foam from the sea after experiencing strong wind and rain conditions. The effect was like a blanket of snow and this made the UK national news.

Transportation 

Footdee was formerly served by the number 15 bus route. The route was withdrawn in July 2022.

Gallery

References

External links
 Historic Environment Scotland

Areas of Aberdeen